Giorgos Kolokithas (alternate spelling: Georgios and Kolokythas; ; November 2, 1945 – March 2, 2013) was a Greek professional basketball player. He is considered one of the best scorers and players in Greek basketball history, and as a player, he had the nickname of "Basket Machine". He was named one of FIBA's 50 Greatest Players in 1991.

Club career
Kolokithas played in his club career with the Greek clubs Sporting and Panathinaikos. While playing with Panathinaikos, he won 4 Greek League championships (1967, 1969, 1971, 1972). He scored a total of 3,529 points in the Greek League, having a personal record game of 51 points. In 1964, 1966, and 1967, he was the Greek League Top Scorer.

In European-wide club competition, with Panathinaikos, he made it to the semifinals of the FIBA European Cup Winners' Cup (FIBA Saporta Cup) in 1969, and the semifinals of the FIBA European Champions' Cup (EuroLeague) in 1972. He was a member of the FIBA European Selection in 1970. He retired at age 28, after suffering a knee injury.

National team career
Kolokithas was a member of the Greek national team. With Greece, he won two silver medals and two bronze medals at the Balkan Championship. He also played with Greece at the 1964 FIBA European Olympic Qualifying Tournament, where he averaged 13.9 points per game, at the 1965 EuroBasket, where he averaged 10.9 points per game, and at the 1967 Mediterranean Games.

At the 1967 EuroBasket, Kolokithas was the Top Scorer of the tournament. During that tournament, he scored a total of 229 points, for a scoring average of 25.4 points per game. He also represented Greece at the 1968 FIBA European Olympic Qualifying Tournament, where he led the tournament in scoring, with an average of 22.8 points per game.

At the 1969 EuroBasket, he was also the Top Scorer of the tournament. At that tournament, he scored a total of 161 points, for a scoring average of 23.0 points per game. Overall, he had 25 caps (games played) at the FIBA EuroBasket, in which he scored a total of 492 points, for a scoring average of 19.7 points per game. 

In total, Kolokithas had 90 caps with the senior Greek national team, in which he scored a total of 1,807 points, for a scoring average of 20.1 points per game. In 1971, Kolokithas retired from Greece's national squad, after he scored 36 points in his last game, which was against Scotland.

Executive career
After he retired from playing club basketball, Kolokithas later became the President of all the Greek national teams, and the Vice President of the Hellenic Basketball Federation.

Awards and accomplishments

Pro career
3× Greek League Top Scorer: (1964, 1966, 1967)
4× Greek League Champion: (1967, 1969, 1971, 1972)
FIBA European Selection: (1970)
FIBA's 50 Greatest Players: (1991)

Greece national team
1963 Balkan Championship: 
1966 Balkan Championship: 
1967 Balkan Championship: 
1969 Balkan Championship: 
2× EuroBasket Top Scorer: (1967, 1969)
European Olympic Qualifying Tournament Top Scorer: (1968)

Death
Kolokithas died, after suffering a heart attack, on March 2, 2013.

References

External links
FIBA Profile 1
FIBA Profile 2
Hellenic Basketball Federation Profile 

1945 births
2013 deaths
Greek basketball executives and administrators
Greek Basket League players
Greek men's basketball players
Panathinaikos B.C. players
Power forwards (basketball)
Sporting basketball players
Sportspeople from Corinth